Patrick Price (born July 18, 1994) known by his video game moniker ACHES, is an American professional esports player. Price is best known for playing  Call of Duty.

Career
Price won the Call of Duty Championship 2014 with compLexity Gaming and the Call of Duty Championship 2018 with Evil Geniuses, making him one of only nine players to have won two or more Call of Duty Championships. 

Price was suspended from MLG events for "repeated harassment" and prohibited from attending four games of the Call of Duty Pro League starting on August 6, and from participating in the July 27 MLG 2K Tournament.

Price officially retired from competitive Call of Duty on January 27, 2022. Along with his retirement, he announced that he was consulting with a studio for a new AAA video game, in addition to joining two Call of Duty League-based series, The Flank and Dexerto's Reverse Sweep. On March 2, 2022, Price announced that he had joined the Ubisoft San Francisco Studio to work on their new title, XDefiant.

Personal life
Price was born on July 18, 1994. He is the son of BJ and Lesa Price and grew up in Sanford, North Carolina, where he was a 2012 graduate of Southern Lee High School.

References

1994 births
Living people
Call of Duty players
CompLexity Gaming players
Evil Geniuses players
Cloud9 (esports) players
FaZe Clan players
American esports players
People from Sanford, North Carolina
Place of birth missing (living people)
Team Envy players
100 Thieves players